Sangharsh 2 is an upcoming Bhojpuri-Language action film co-produced by Ratnakar Kumar and Kuldeep Srivastava, Directed by Parag Patil and written by Veeru Thakur. A sequal to 2018 film Sangharsh, the film stars Khesari Lal Yadav, Meghasri and Sanjay Pandey.

This film is said to be the biggest Bhojpuri film in terms of Budget, which has been shot in  Thailand, UAE and India. Principal photography commenced in early August 2022 and ended in  Mid January 2023 with filming primary taking place in Gorakhpur, Dubai, Pattaya and Bangkok. It is second Bhojpuri film after Nirahua Chalal London to be shot in three different countries and the first Bhojpuri film to be shot in Thailand.

Cast

 Khesari Lal Yadav
 Meghasri
 Sanjay Pandey
 Saba Khan
 Mahi Srivastava

 Kriti Yadav
 Vinit Vishal
 Suresh Oberoi as Narrator (in Voice)
 Sushil Singh
 Anup Arora
 Pappu Yadav
 Vineet Vishal
 Neelam Vashisht
 Vinod Mishra
 Samarth Chaturvedi
 Gaurav Rai
 Nishta Tiwari 
 Akash Sisodiya

Production

Development 
In December 2021, producer of the prequel Sangharsh, Ratnakar Kumar and Khesari came together, and it was expected that something big is going to come. Sangharsh 2 was announced earlier too but postponed for some reason. In August 2022, it was announced that the filming will commence soon in Bangkok Khesari also posted on Instagram flaunting his Six pack abs, with the caption "thik ba nu? Ki auri" (is it fine? Or you want more?), the he had made for his role in the film.

Casting 

Initially, there was a suspense on the name of actress for the females lead. It was rumoured that seven actresses are being considered, and out of them one will be the female lead. These names were Akshara Singh, Amrapali Dubey, Kajal Raghwani, Mahi Srivastava, Meghasri, Saba Khan and Shweta Mahara. Finally, Meghasri was announced for the female lead and Mahi Srivastava and Saba Khan for the supporting roles. Later, the name of Sanjay Pandey was announced for the negative role. There are nine villains in the movie. During the shoot Khesari's daughter, Kriti Yadav also became the part of the movie. In November, the producers officially announced that Suresh Oberoi, father of Vivek Oberoi, would narrate this film.

Filming 
The film was to film at various locations in Bangkok and Gorakhpur and Bhuj.The first schedule of the Principal photography commenced in August 2022 in Bangkok. Producer Ratnakar Kumar shared some stills from the Bangkok shoot on his social media. The second schedule started from 28 August in Gorakhpur. Various Stills of Khesari were leaked from the sets onto the internet with khesari's look in white beard and hairs, wearing Police uniform sometimes. Khesari also shared a still from the movie in his Instagram handle, in which he was in white hair and beard, with a Cigarette in mouth and a M61 Vulcan in his hand. The third schedule that was planned to be shot in Gujarat cancelled due to bad weather and shot in Gorakhpur. It was also being said that the final schedule will be filmed in Dubai. The finals shots of the film were shot in Dubai on 20th January 2023 and the filming complete with it. The film shot at different locations, and is the first Bhojpuri film to be shot in Thailand, and also the first Bhojpuri film to be shot in three different countries.

Marketing 

The first look poster of the film was revealed on 10 February 2023. The teaser of the film was released on 14th February, coinciding with Valentine's Day.

Music

Music of this film is composed by Krishna Bedardi.

Release

Reception

References

Upcoming films
2020s Bhojpuri-language films
Films shot in Thailand